The obol (obolos; plural oboli) was the currency of the United States of the Ionian Islands between 1819 and 1863. Until 1834, 1 obol = 4 lepta (singular lepton), after which 1 obol = 5 lepta. Throughout its existence, the obol was equal to a British half penny. The obol replaced a series of countermarked coins denominated in Turkish paras and copper gazete coins. The obol was issued by the British and was replaced by the Greek drachma when the Ionian Islands were given to Greece, at a rate of 1 drachma = 20 oboli.

An unusual denomination was the silver 30 Lepta coin.

External links

 Online Coin Club / Coins from Ionian Islands
 Coins from Ionian islands on Numista.com

Currencies of Greece
Modern obsolete currencies
1819 establishments in the Ottoman Empire
19th-century establishments in Greece
1863 disestablishments in Greece
19th-century economic history
United States of the Ionian Islands
Currencies of British Overseas Territories